Donald Pinnock is a South African writer, investigative journalist, and photographer. He was born in 1947, in Queenstown, South Africa, and educated at Queens College. He is a Research Fellow at the Centre of Criminology, University of Cape Town,. and a former editor of Getaway magazine in Cape Town. He has been an electronic engineer, lecturer in journalism and criminology, consultant to the Mandela government, a professional yachtsman, explorer, travel and environmental writer, photographer and a cable-car operator on the Rock of Gibraltar. His passions are species conservation in Africa and the relationship between early social and biological trauma and high-risk adolescent behavior.

Academic and professional career 
Pinnock has a PhD in political science, an MA in criminology, a BA in African history and has published a post-doctoral study on gangs, rituals and rites of passage. He has held lectureships in Journalism (Rhodes) and Criminology (University of Cape Town) and conducted his PhD research at School of Oriental and African Studies, London University. He was the first Writer in Residence at South Africa's Antarctic SANAE IV base (2005–06).

As a criminologist, he was one of the co-drafters for the ANC government of the Youth Justice White Paper, which became the Child Justice Act. He is a specialist in adolescent deviance, was one of the founders of the Usiko Trust and is a trustee of the Chrysalis Academy, both involved with support and training for high-risk youth. He is an Honorary Research Associate in the Centre of Criminology, University of Cape Town.

He was appointed a commissioner of the International Union for Conservation of Nature (IUCN) in 2017.

He has held three photographic exhibitions in Cape Town: The Wonder of Elephants and Postcards from the Road. $treet$ is a traveling exhibition that explores gang life.

He is a columnist for BA High Life and Mahala and researcher/writer for the Conservation Action Trust, The Dodo and Daily Maverick

Awards 
 1979 – Diocesan College History Prize: African history
 1993 – Robert Ally Award: journalism
 1997 – Pica Award: Environment, Wildlife & Conservation Journalism Award
 1997 – Mondi Award for Journalism: Foresight
 1998 – Mondi Award for Journalism: Issues
 1999 – Pica Award: Consumer Journalism
 1999 – Pica Award: Wildlife & Conservation Journalism Award
 2001 – Mondi Award for Journalism: Foresight
 2001 – Mondi Award for Journalism: Columns
 2009 – Finalist, European Union Literary Award (for Rainmaker)
 2010 – Finalist, Mondi Award for Journalism: Columns
 2013 – City Press Non-Fiction Award for his book Gang Town

Personal life 
He is married to the novelist and poet Patricia Schonstein, with whom he has a son and a daughter.

Works 

 Elsies River: a Popular History, 1981 
 The Brotherhoods: Street Gangs and State Control, 1984 
 Gangs, Rituals and Rites of Passage, 1997 
 Telona, 1998
 They Fought for Freedom, 2000
 Natural Selections: The African Wanderings Of a Bemused Naturalist, 2002 
 African Journeys, 2004 
 Writing Left: The Radical Journalism of Ruth First, 2007 
 Loveletters to Africa, 2008 
 Blue Ice: Travels in Antarctica, 2008
 The Woman who Lived in a Tree and Other Perfect Strangers, 2009 
 Rainmaker, 2010 
 Voices of Liberation: Ruth First, 2012 
 Wild Resilience: Working with high-risk adolescents using wilderness, ritual & mentorship, 2015
 Gang Town, 2016
 The Last Elephants2019

References

Further reading 

Daily Maverick's Gang Town book review

South African Crime Quarterly's Gang Town book review

Getaway Magazine's Blue Ice: Travels in Antarctica book review

Why it's important to understand the types of gangs in Cape Town

Interview with Don Pinnock

Author Don Pinnock discusses his book Gang Town

External links 
 Official website
 Don Pinnock on South African Journalist's Wiki
 Interviews conducted by Don Pinnock for Ruth First Papers
 Travel Writing Course with Don Pinnock
 Don Pinnock at the Open Book Festival
 List of articles written for the Mail & Guardian
 List of articles written for The Dodo
 List of articles written for Conservation Action Trust

Academic staff of the University of Cape Town
1947 births
Living people
South African journalists